NGC 5068 is a face-on field barred spiral galaxy in the Virgo constellation. NGC 5068 is located approximately 22 million light-years away and has a diameter that exceeds 45000 light-years.

References

External links
 

Barred spiral galaxies
Field galaxies
Virgo (constellation)
5068
46400